Crataegus pratensis is a species of hawthorn known by the common name prairie hawthorn.

References

pratensis
Flora of North America